Palaquium rigidum is a tree in the family Sapotaceae. The specific epithet rigidum means "rigid", referring to the leaves.

Description
The bark is reddish grey. Inflorescences bear up to four flowers.

Distribution and habitat
Palaquium rigidum is endemic to Borneo where it is confined to Sarawak. Its habitat is lowland mixed dipterocarp forests.

References

rigidum
Endemic flora of Borneo
Trees of Borneo
Flora of Sarawak
Plants described in 1909